Di-N-acetylchitobiase is an enzyme that in humans is encoded by the CTBS gene.

References

External links

Further reading